QText was a popular Hebrew-English word processing application for DOS in the late 1980s and early 90s.  It was developed by Dvir Software from kibbutz Dvir, Israel, and programmed in Turbo Pascal.

QText was one of the first word processing applications that stored bi-directional text in logical order (by letter-typing-order and not visual order). It was also one of the first applications to support Hebrew filenames. In its DOS incarnations, the interface was text-based and did not offer WYSIWYG.

A Windows-compatible version of QText was released, but the brand faded out from the public as Windows gained popularity and Microsoft Word with Hebrew support became available. QText is no longer developed.

The DOS version of QText used encoding starting at the hexadecimal code 128d  for the Aleph character.

An early version of their web pages has a working (tested July 2011) link to a 30-day free trial of the Windows version.

See also
Comparison of word processors
List of word processors

References

1988 software
Discontinued software
Word processors